The  was a railway line in Karafuto Prefecture during the days of the Empire of Japan. By 1937, it ran  from Ōdomari Port Station in what is now Korsakov to Sakaehama Station.

Route
As published by the Ministry of Railways, as of 1 October 1937 the stations of the East Coast Line were as follows:

See also
 West Coast Line

References

Karafuto
History of rail transport in Japan